The Vera Institute of Justice, founded in 1961, is an independent nonprofit national research and policy organization in the United States. Based primarily in New York City, Vera also has offices in Washington, DC, and describes its goal as "to tackle the most pressing injustices of our day: from the causes and consequences of mass incarceration, racial disparities, and the loss of public trust in law enforcement, to the unmet needs of the vulnerable, the marginalized, and those harmed by crime and violence."

Founding 
The Vera Institute of Justice was founded in New York City in 1961 by the philanthropist Louis Schweitzer and the magazine editor Herb Sturz. Both of them considered the city's bail system at the time to be unjust since it granted release based largely on income. Working with criminal justice leaders, they explored the problem, developed a solution, and rigorously tested it.

Within a few years, they had demonstrated that New Yorkers too poor to afford bail but with strong ties to their communities could be released and still show up for trial. Eventually, the model devised by Vera was adopted in many municipalities across the United States and led to the Bail Reform Act of 1966, which was signed by US President Lyndon B. Johnson and was the most significant reform of the bail system in America since 1789.

Funding and support 
In 1966, the Vera Institute of Justice received assistance from the Ford Foundation to turn the foundation into a private nonprofit organization. Vera's annual operating budget is approximately $25 million. About 66% of its funding comes from work with governments, and the rest is supplied through agencies and other donors.

In March 2022, the Vera Institute of Justice received a $171.7 million government contract (that could reach as high as $983 million if the contract is extended to March 2027) to provide unaccompanied migrant children legal assistance.

Prison commission
The Vera Institute of Justice organized the Commission on Safety and Abuse in America’s Prisons, to study issues relating to prison violence and abuse. The commission was co-chaired by former US Attorney General Nicholas Katzenbach and former judge of the United States Court of Appeals for the Third Circuit, John Joseph Gibbons. On June 8, 2006, the commission released its report to the US Congress recommending more attention be given to address problems of violence, insufficient mental health treatment, and health care in prisons. At a broader level, the commission criticized US policy towards incarceration as costly and ineffective.

References

External links
 Vera Institute of Justice

Criminal justice think tanks
Think tanks based in the United States
Think tanks established in 1961
Criminal justice reform in the United States
1961 establishments in New York City
Organizations based in New York City